The 1989 Chicago Cubs season was the 118th season of the franchise, the 114th in the National League and 74th season at Wrigley Field. The Cubs were managed by Don Zimmer in his second season as manager and played their home games at Wrigley Field as members of Major League Baseball's National League East Division.  

The Cubs stole the National League spotlight during the 1989 season along with their NL West rivals San Francisco Giants. The Cubs had All-Star seasons from Ryne Sandberg, Andre Dawson, Rick Sutcliffe, and closing pitcher Mitch Williams.  Williams gave the Cubs a strong stopper in the bullpen in his impressive National League debut while the 1989 NL Rookie of the Year was Chicago's very own Jerome Walton, who proved himself to be a dependable centerfielder.  

The Cubs finished the season 93–69 to win the East Division for the second time in franchise history, battling the St. Louis Cardinals into the last week of the season. The Cubs lost the National League Championship Series four games to one to the San Francisco Giants, who proved to be more dominant with a strong hitting presence.

Offseason
 December 5, 1988: Rafael Palmeiro, Jamie Moyer, and Drew Hall were traded by the Cubs to the Texas Rangers in exchange for Paul Kilgus, Mitch Williams, Curtis Wilkerson, Steve Wilson, Luis Benitez (minors), and Pablo Delgado (minors).
 December 7, 1988: Scott Sanderson was signed as a free agent by the Cubs.
 December 8, 1988: Rolando Roomes was traded by the Chicago Cubs to the Cincinnati Reds for Lloyd McClendon.
 March 28, 1989: Rich Gossage was released by the Cubs.

Regular season

Season standings

Record vs. opponents

Notable transactions
 August 24, 1989: The Cubs traded players to be named later to the Atlanta Braves for Paul Assenmacher. The Cubs completed the deal by sending Kelly Mann and Pat Gomez to the Braves on September 1.
 August 30, 1989: Calvin Schiraldi, Darrin Jackson and a player to be named later were traded by the Cubs to the San Diego Padres for Marvell Wynne and Luis Salazar. The Cubs completed the deal by sending Phil Stephenson to the Padres on September 5.

Roster

Game log

|- align="center" bgcolor="bbffbb"
|1||April 4|| Phillies||5–4 ||Sutcliffe (1–0)||Youmans (0–1)||Williams (1)|| 33,361 ||1–0||
|- align="center" bgcolor="ffbbbb"
|2||April 5|| Phillies||12–4 ||Howell (1–0)||Maddux (0–1)||Maddux (1)|| 18,674 ||1–1||
|- align="center" bgcolor="ffbbbb"
|3||April 6|| Phillies||8–3 ||Ontiveros (1–0)||Kilgus (0–1)|||| 6,364 ||1–2||
|- align="center" bgcolor="bbffbb"
|4||April 7|| Pirates||6–5 ||Wilson (1–0)||Taylor (0–1)||Williams (2)|| 6,195 ||2–2||
|- align="center" bgcolor="bbffbb"
|5||April 8|| Pirates||5–3 ||Bielecki (1–0)||Heaton (0–1)||Schiraldi (1)|| 19,374 ||3–2||
|- align="center" bgcolor="bbffbb"
|6||April 9|| Pirates||8–3 ||Sutcliffe (2–0)||Walk (0–1)|||| 11,387 ||4–2||
|- align="center" bgcolor="bbffbb"
|7||April 11|| Cardinals||5–4 ||Schiraldi (1–0)||DeLeón (1–1)||Williams (3)|| 7,943 ||5–2||
|- align="center" bgcolor="bbffbb"
|8||April 12|| Cardinals||3–2 ||Kilgus (1–1)||Terry (0–1)||Williams (4)|| 21,187 ||6–2||
|- align="center" bgcolor="bbffbb"
|9||April 14||@ Phillies||6–4 ||Sanderson (1–0)||Ruffin (0–2)||Williams (5)|| 20,851 ||7–2||
|- align="center" bgcolor="bbffbb"
|10||April 16||@ Phillies||5–3 ||Sutcliffe (3–0)||Youmans (0–2)||Williams (6)|| 32,249 ||8–2||
|- align="center" bgcolor="ffbbbb"
|11||April 17||@ Expos||2–1 ||Gross (2–1)||Maddux (0–2)||Burke (3)|| 8,847 ||8–3||
|- align="center" bgcolor="ffbbbb"
|12||April 18||@ Expos||11–2 ||B. Smith (1–0)||Kilgus (1–2)|||| 11,913 ||8–4||
|- align="center" bgcolor="ffbbbb"
|13||April 19||@ Expos||3–2 ||Den. Martinez (1–0)||Sanderson (1–1)||Burke (4)|| 9,014 ||8–5||
|- align="center" bgcolor="ffbbbb"
|14||April 20||@ Mets||4–3 ||Gooden (3–0)||Williams (0–1)||McDowell (1)|| 28,944 ||8–6||
|- align="center" bgcolor="bbffbb"
|15||April 21||@ Mets||8–4 ||Sutcliffe (4–0)||Ojeda (0–3)||Wilson (1)|| 34,690 ||9–6||
|- align="center" bgcolor="ffbbbb"
|16||April 22||@ Mets||3–1 ||Fernandez (2–0)||Maddux (0–3)||McDowell (2)|| 41,323 ||9–7||
|- align="center" bgcolor="ffbbbb"
|17||April 23||@ Mets||4–2 ||Aguilera (1–0)||Schiraldi (1–1)|||| 40,268 ||9–8||
|- align="center" bgcolor="ffbbbb"
|18||April 25|| Dodgers||4–0 ||Belcher (2–1)||Sanderson (1–2)|||| 31,876 ||9–9||
|- align="center" bgcolor="ffbbbb"
|19||April 26|| Dodgers||3–1 ||Morgan (2–1)||Sutcliffe (4–1)||Howell (2)|| 13,221 ||9–10||
|- align="center" bgcolor="bbffbb"
|20||April 27|| Dodgers||1–0 ||Maddux (1–3)||Hershiser (3–2)|||| 12,013 ||10–10||
|- align="center" bgcolor="bbffbb"
|21||April 28|| Padres||3–1 ||Kilgus (2–2)||Rasmussen (1–4)||Williams (7)|| 9,504 ||11–10||
|- align="center" bgcolor="ffbbbb"
|22||April 29|| Padres||5–4 ||Terrell (3–2)||Bielecki (1–1)||Davis (11)|| 34,748 ||11–11||
|- align="center" bgcolor="bbffbb"
|23||April 30|| Padres||7–3 ||Sanderson (2–2)||Show (4–2)|||| 28,735 ||12–11||
|-

|- align="center" bgcolor="bbffbb"
|24||May 1||@ Giants||4 – 3 12||Pico (1–0)||LaCoss (1–2)||Schiraldi (2)|| 17,914 ||13–11||
|- align="center" bgcolor="ffbbbb"
|25||May 2||@ Giants||4–0 ||Reuschel (4–2)||Maddux (1–4)||Gossage (1)|| 11,128 ||13–12||
|- align="center" bgcolor="bbffbb"
|26||May 3||@ Padres||5–4 ||Kilgus (3–2)||Grant (0–1)||Williams (8)|| 20,403 ||14–12||
|- align="center" bgcolor="bbffbb"
|27||May 4||@ Padres||4–0 ||Bielecki (2–1)||Terrell (3–3)|||| 25,892 ||15–12||
|- align="center" bgcolor="bbffbb"
|28||May 5||@ Dodgers||4–2 ||Sanderson (3–2)||Belcher (2–3)||Williams (9)|| 46,767 ||16–12||
|- align="center" bgcolor="ffbbbb"
|29||May 6||@ Dodgers||3–0 ||Morgan (3–1)||Sutcliffe (4–2)||Howell (3)|| 46,389 ||16–13||
|- align="center" bgcolor="bbffbb"
|30||May 7||@ Dodgers||4–2 ||Wilson (2–0)||Hershiser (4–3)||Williams (10)|| 46,329 ||17–13||
|- align="center" bgcolor="ffbbbb"
|31||May 9|| Giants||4–2 ||Krukow (2–0)||Kilgus (3–3)||Lefferts (5)|| 13,949 ||17–14||
|- align="center" bgcolor="ffbbbb"
|32||May 10|| Giants||4–3 ||LaCoss (2–3)||Williams (0–2)||Lefferts (6)|| 25,638 ||17–15||
|- align="center" bgcolor="ffbbbb"
|33||May 12|| Astros||3–1 ||Deshaies (5–2)||Sutcliffe (4–3)|||| 21,141 ||17–16||
|- align="center" bgcolor="ffbbbb"
|34||May 13|| Astros||1–0 ||Knepper (2–5)||Maddux (1–5)||Smith (6)|| 27,775 ||17–17||
|- align="center" bgcolor="ffbbbb"
|35||May 14|| Astros||5–1 ||Scott (5–2)||Kilgus (3–4)|||| 23,391 ||17–18||
|- align="center" bgcolor="bbffbb"
|36||May 15|| Braves||4–0 ||Bielecki (3–1)||Lilliquist (2–3)|||| 16,920 ||18–18||
|- align="center" bgcolor="bbffbb"
|37||May 16|| Braves||4–3 ||Sanderson (4–2)||Glavine (5–1)||Williams (11)|| 24,070 ||19–18||
|- align="center" bgcolor="bbffbb"
|38||May 17|| Braves||4–0 ||Pico (2–0)||Z. Smith (1–6)|||| 31,196 ||20–18||
|- align="center" bgcolor="bbffbb"
|39||May 19||@ Reds||8–2 ||Maddux (2–5)||Jackson (2–7)|||| 29,202 ||21–18||
|- align="center" bgcolor="bbffbb"
|40||May 20||@ Reds||7–3 ||Kilgus (4–4)||Browning (3–4)||Perry (1)|| 49,175 ||22–18||
|- align="center" bgcolor="ffbbbb"
|41||May 21||@ Reds||7–2 ||Mahler (6–4)||Bielecki (3–2)|||| 34,128 ||22–19||
|- align="center" bgcolor="bbffbb"
|42||May 22||@ Astros||5–3 ||Sutcliffe (5–3)||Deshaies (5–3)||Schiraldi (3)|| 11,923 ||23–19||
|- align="center" bgcolor="bbffbb"
|43||May 23||@ Astros||5–4 ||Sanderson (5–2)||Scott (6–3)||Schiraldi (4)|| 15,665 ||24–19||
|- align="center" bgcolor="bbffbb"
|44||May 24||@ Astros||3–1 ||Maddux (3–5)||Knepper (2–6)||Williams (12)|| 17,042 ||25–19||
|- align="center" bgcolor="ffbbbb"
|45||May 26|| Reds||10 – 8 12||Dibble (4–1)||Schiraldi (1–2)|||| 33,583 ||25–20||
|- align="center" bgcolor="bbffbb"
|46||May 27|| Reds||5–3 ||Sutcliffe (6–3)||Rijo (4–1)|||| 34,546 ||26–20||
|- align="center" bgcolor="bbffbb"
|47||May 28|| Reds||6–1 ||Bielecki (4–2)||Jackson (3–8)|||| 37,231 ||27–20||
|- align="center" bgcolor="ffbbbb"
|48||May 29||@ Braves||2–1 ||Lilliquist (3–3)||Sanderson (5–3)||Boever (7)|| 15,123 ||27–21||
|- align="center" bgcolor="bbffbb"
|49||May 30||@ Braves||3–2 ||Maddux (4–5)||P. Smith (1–7)||Williams (13)|| 7,566 ||28–21||
|- align="center" bgcolor="ffbbbb"
|50||May 31||@ Braves||3–2 ||Smoltz (7–3)||Kilgus (4–5)||Boever (8)|| 7,958 ||28–22||
|-

|- align="center" bgcolor="bbffbb"
|51||June 2||@ Cardinals||5–2 ||Sutcliffe (7–3)||Magrane (3–4)||Williams (14)|| 46,448 ||29–22||
|- align="center" bgcolor="ffbbbb"
|52||June 3||@ Cardinals||6 – 5 10||Quisenberry (2–1)||Schiraldi (1–3)|||| 44,719 ||29–23||
|- align="center" bgcolor="bbffbb"
|53||June 4||@ Cardinals||11–3 ||Sanderson (6–3)||Terry (4–5)|||| 45,659 ||30–23||
|- align="center" bgcolor="bbffbb"
|54||June 5|| Mets||15–3 ||Maddux (5–5)||Cone (3–5)|||| 34,840 ||31–23||
|- align="center" bgcolor="bbffbb"
|55||June 6|| Mets||8–4 ||Kilgus (5–5)||Ojeda (2–6)|||| 33,558 ||32–23||
|- align="center" bgcolor="ffbbbb"
|56||June 7|| Mets||10–5 ||Gooden (7–2)||Sutcliffe (7–4)||Aguilera (4)|| 35,372 ||32–24||
|- align="center" bgcolor="bbffbb"
|57||June 8|| Mets||5 – 4 10||Williams (1–2)||Aase (1–2)|||| 36,358 ||33–24||
|- align="center" bgcolor="ffbbbb"
|58||June 9|| Cardinals||1–0 ||DeLeón (8–3)||Sanderson (6–4)||Worrell (7)|| 34,937 ||33–25||
|- align="center" bgcolor="ffbbbb"
|59||June 10|| Cardinals||6–0 ||Magrane (4–5)||Maddux (5–6)|||| 38,045 ||33–26||
|- align="center" bgcolor="ffbbbb"
|60||June 11|| Cardinals||10–7 ||Carpenter (2–4)||Schiraldi (1–4)|||| 35,450 ||33–27||
|- align="center" bgcolor="bbffbb"
|61||June 12|| Cardinals||10–3 ||Wilson (3–0)||Terry (4–6)|||| 27,154 ||34–27||
|- align="center" bgcolor="bbffbb"
|62||June 13||@ Mets||4–2 ||Bielecki (5–2)||Darling (4–5)||Williams (15)|| 26,664 ||35–27||
|- align="center" bgcolor="ffbbbb"
|63||June 14||@ Mets||2 – 0 7||Gooden (8–2)||Sanderson (6–5)||Aguilera (5)|| 27,278 ||35–28||
|- align="center" bgcolor="ffbbbb"
|64||June 15||@ Mets||4 – 3 12||Aguilera (3–1)||Perry (0–1)|||| 24,689 ||35–29||
|- align="center" bgcolor="ffbbbb"
|65||June 16||@ Expos||8–5 ||B. Smith (7–2)||Kilgus (5–6)||Burke (14)|| 26,264 ||35–30||
|- align="center" bgcolor="bbffbb"
|66||June 17||@ Expos||3–2 ||Sutcliffe (8–4)||Pérez (3–8)||Williams (16)|| 35,095 ||36–30||
|- align="center" bgcolor="bbffbb"
|67||June 18||@ Expos||5–4 ||Bielecki (6–2)||Langston (2–2)||Williams (17)|| 35,968 ||37–30||
|- align="center" bgcolor="bbffbb"
|68||June 20||@ Pirates||5 – 4 11||Schiraldi (2–4)||Garcia (0–1)||Kilgus (1)|| 11,713 ||38–30||
|- align="center" bgcolor="bbffbb"
|69||June 21||@ Pirates||1 – 0 11||Maddux (6–6)||Bair (0–1)||Williams (18)|| 23,970 ||39–30||
|- align="center" bgcolor="bbffbb"
|70||June 22||@ Pirates||8–0 ||Sutcliffe (9–4)||Kramer (1–4)|||| 16,430 ||40–30||
|- align="center" bgcolor="ffbbbb"
|71||June 23|| Expos||5–1 ||Langston (3–2)||Bielecki (6–3)||Burke (15)|| 36,239 ||40–31||
|- align="center" bgcolor="ffbbbb"
|72||June 24|| Expos||5–0 ||Gross (7–6)||Kilgus (5–7)|||| 36,068 ||40–32||
|- align="center" bgcolor="ffbbbb"
|73||June 25|| Expos||5–0 ||Den. Martinez (7–1)||Sanderson (6–6)|||| 34,491 ||40–33||
|- align="center" bgcolor="ffbbbb"
|74||June 26|| Pirates||2–1 ||Drabek (5–5)||Maddux (6–7)|||| 35,407 ||40–34||
|- align="center" bgcolor="ffbbbb"
|75||June 27|| Pirates||5–4 ||Kramer (2–4)||Sutcliffe (9–5)||Landrum (7)|| 35,646 ||40–35||
|- align="center" bgcolor="ffbbbb"
|76||June 28|| Pirates||3–1 ||Robinson (4–6)||Bielecki (6–4)||Landrum (8)|| 34,114 ||40–36||
|- align="center" bgcolor="ffbbbb"
|77||June 29||@ Giants||12–2 ||Brantley (1–0)||Kilgus (5–8)|||| 12,339 ||40–37||
|- align="center" bgcolor="bbffbb"
|78||June 30||@ Giants||6–4 ||Sanderson (7–6)||Wilson (0–1)||Williams (19)|| 49,241 ||41–37||
|-

|- align="center" bgcolor="bbffbb"
|79||July 1||@ Giants||3–2 ||Maddux (7–7)||Reuschel (12–3)||Williams (20)|| 29,019 ||42–37||
|- align="center" bgcolor="ffbbbb"
|80||July 2||@ Giants||4–3 ||Brantley (2–0)||Sutcliffe (9–6)||Bedrosian (12)|| 41,350 ||42–38||
|- align="center" bgcolor="bbffbb"
|81||July 4|| Padres||5–1 ||Bielecki (7–4)||Whitson (10–6)||Wilson (2)|| 32,920 ||43–38||
|- align="center" bgcolor="bbffbb"
|82||July 5|| Padres||5–3 ||Sanderson (8–6)||Rasmussen (3–6)||Kilgus (2)|| 33,464 ||44–38||
|- align="center" bgcolor="bbffbb"
|83||July 6|| Padres||7–3 ||Maddux (8–7)||Terrell (4–12)||Williams (21)|| 34,814 ||45–38||
|- align="center" bgcolor="bbffbb"
|84||July 7|| Dodgers||6–4 ||Sutcliffe (10–6)||Wetteland (2–2)||Williams (22)|| 35,434 ||46–38||
|- align="center" bgcolor="ffbbbb"
|85||July 8|| Dodgers||8–2 ||Morgan (6–8)||Pico (2–1)|||| 37,096 ||46–39||
|- align="center" bgcolor="bbffbb"
|86||July 9|| Dodgers||11–4 ||Bielecki (8–4)||Valenzuela (4–8)|||| 35,533 ||47–39||
|- align="center" bgcolor="bbffbb"
|87||July 13||@ Padres||7–3 ||Maddux (9–7)||Hurst (7–7)||Lancaster (1)|| 23,481 ||48–39||
|- align="center" bgcolor="ffbbbb"
|88||July 14||@ Padres||7–4 ||Whitson (12–6)||Bielecki (8–5)||Davis (23)|| 27,649 ||48–40||
|- align="center" bgcolor="ffbbbb"
|89||July 15||@ Padres||3–2 ||Terrell (5–12)||Kilgus (5–9)|||| 54,717 ||48–41||
|- align="center" bgcolor="ffbbbb"
|90||July 16||@ Padres||4–3 ||Rasmussen (4–6)||Sutcliffe (10–7)||Davis (24)|| 30,549 ||48–42||
|- align="center" bgcolor="bbffbb"
|91||July 17||@ Dodgers||6–3 ||Lancaster (1–0)||Leary (6–7)||Williams (23)|| 39,914 ||49–42||
|- align="center" bgcolor="ffbbbb"
|92||July 18||@ Dodgers||4–1 ||Hershiser (11–7)||Maddux (9–8)|||| 37,543 ||49–43||
|- align="center" bgcolor="bbffbb"
|93||July 19||@ Dodgers||4–0 ||Bielecki (9–5)||Morgan (6–10)|||| 40,050 ||50–43||
|- align="center" bgcolor="bbffbb"
|94||July 20|| Giants||4 – 3 11||Lancaster (2–0)||McCament (1–1)|||| 32,306 ||51–43||
|- align="center" bgcolor="ffbbbb"
|95||July 21|| Giants||4–3 ||Garrelts (8–3)||Sutcliffe (10–8)||Lefferts (17)|| 34,725 ||51–44||
|- align="center" bgcolor="bbffbb"
|96||July 22|| Giants||5–2 ||Sanderson (9–6)||Hammaker (6–5)||Lancaster (2)|| 35,530 ||52–44||
|- align="center" bgcolor="bbffbb"
|97||July 23|| Giants||9–5 ||Maddux (10–8)||Robinson (8–7)|||| 35,707 ||53–44||
|- align="center" bgcolor="bbffbb"
|98||July 24||@ Cardinals||3–2 ||Bielecki (10–5)||Terry (7–9)||Williams (24)|| 45,183 ||54–44||
|- align="center" bgcolor="bbffbb"
|99||July 25||@ Cardinals||4–2 ||Kilgus (6–9)||Magrane (11–7)||Williams (25)|| 46,621 ||55–44||
|- align="center" bgcolor="ffbbbb"
|100||July 26||@ Cardinals||2–0 ||DeLeón (10–9)||Sutcliffe (10–9)||Worrell (13)|| 43,000 ||55–45||
|- align="center" bgcolor="bbffbb"
|101||July 28|| Mets||6–5 ||Schiraldi (3–4)||Aguilera (6–5)||Williams (26)|| 37,554 ||56–45||
|- align="center" bgcolor="bbffbb"
|102||July 29|| Mets||10–3 ||Maddux (11–8)||Whitehurst (0–1)|||| 38,012 ||57–45||
|- align="center" bgcolor="bbffbb"
|103||July 30|| Mets||6–4 ||Lancaster (3–0)||Aguilera (6–6)|||| 36,837 ||58–45||
|- align="center" bgcolor="bbffbb"
|104||July 31||@ Phillies||10–2 ||Sutcliffe (11–9)||Mulholland (1–5)||||||59–45||
|- align="center" bgcolor="ffbbbb"
|105||July 31||@ Phillies||7–4 ||Carman (3–11)||Kilgus (6–10)||Parrett (4)|| 22,160 ||59–46||
|-

|- align="center" bgcolor="bbffbb"
|- align="center" bgcolor="bbffbb"
|106||August 1||@ Phillies||4–1 ||Wilson (4–0)||McWilliams (2–11)||Williams (27)|| 23,614 ||60–46||
|- align="center" bgcolor="ffbbbb"
|107||August 2||@ Phillies||6–0 ||Howell (9–7)||Sanderson (9–7)|||| 21,688 ||60–47||
|- align="center" bgcolor="bbffbb"
|108||August 3||@ Phillies||2–0 ||Maddux (12–8)||Ruffin (3–5)||Lancaster (3)|| 21,983 ||61–47||
|- align="center" bgcolor="bbffbb"
|109||August 4||@ Pirates||3–2 ||Bielecki (11–5)||Drabek (8–8)||Williams (28)|| 29,169 ||62–47||
|- align="center" bgcolor="bbffbb"
|110||August 5||@ Pirates||4–2 ||Wilson (5–0)||Landrum (2–2)||Lancaster (4)|| 23,262 ||63–47||
|- align="center" bgcolor="ffbbbb"
|111||August 6||@ Pirates||5 – 4 18||Drabek (9–8)||Sanderson (9–8)|||| 24,716 ||63–48||
|- align="center" bgcolor="bbffbb"
|112||August 7|| Expos||5–2 ||Maddux (13–8)||Pérez (6–11)|||| 39,002 ||64–48||
|- align="center" bgcolor="bbffbb"
|113||August 8|| Expos||4–2 ||Bielecki (12–5)||Den. Martinez (12–2)||Lancaster (5)|| 38,126 ||65–48||
|- align="center" bgcolor="bbffbb"
|114||August 9|| Expos||3–0 ||Sutcliffe (12–9)||B. Smith (9–6)||Williams (29)|| 39,009 ||66–48||
|- align="center" bgcolor="ffbbbb"
|115||August 10|| Phillies||16–13 ||Parrett (9–4)||Wilson (5–1)|||| 36,745 ||66–49||
|- align="center" bgcolor="bbffbb"
|116||August 11|| Phillies||9–2 ||Maddux (14–8)||Carman (3–12)|||| 36,440 ||67–49||
|- align="center" bgcolor="bbffbb"
|117||August 12|| Phillies||9–7 ||Bielecki (13–5)||Howell (9–8)||Williams (30)|| 37,752 ||68–49||
|- align="center" bgcolor="ffbbbb"
|118||August 13|| Phillies||5–3 ||Parrett (10–4)||Wilson (5–2)|||| 37,054 ||68–50||
|- align="center" bgcolor="bbffbb"
|119||August 15||@ Reds||5 – 2 12||Williams (2–2)||Roesler (0–1)|||| 31,694 ||69–50||
|- align="center" bgcolor="bbffbb"
|120||August 16||@ Reds||5–1 ||Bielecki (14–5)||Leary (8–10)|||| 29,764 ||70–50||
|- align="center" bgcolor="bbffbb"
|121||August 17||@ Reds||3–2 ||Sutcliffe (13–9)||Franco (3–6)||Williams (31)|| 29,278 ||71–50||
|- align="center" bgcolor="ffbbbb"
|122||August 18||@ Astros||6–5 ||Smith (3–3)||Schiraldi (3–5)|||| 31,987 ||71–51||
|- align="center" bgcolor="ffbbbb"
|123||August 19||@ Astros||8–4 ||Portugal (3–1)||Maddux (14–9)|||| 41,661 ||71–52||
|- align="center" bgcolor="ffbbbb"
|124||August 20||@ Astros||8–4 ||Darwin (11–3)||Lancaster (3–1)|||| 38,624 ||71–53||
|- align="center" bgcolor="ffbbbb"
|125||August 21|| Reds||6 – 5 10||Charlton (6–1)||Schiraldi (3–6)||Franco (26)|| 37,626 ||71–54||
|- align="center" bgcolor="ffbbbb"
|126||August 22|| Reds||7–2 ||Browning (13–10)||Kraemer (0–1)|||| 35,179 ||71–55||
|- align="center" bgcolor="ffbbbb"
|127||August 23|| Reds||8–5 ||Scudder (3–5)||Maddux (14–10)|||| 33,054 ||71–56||
|- align="center" bgcolor="bbffbb"
|128||August 25|| Braves||4 – 3 12||Williams (3–2)||Eichhorn (4–4)|||| 35,456 ||72–56||
|- align="center" bgcolor="ffbbbb"
|129||August 26|| Braves||5–3 ||Valdez (1–2)||Sutcliffe (13–10)||Boever (21)|| 35,752 ||72–57||
|- align="center" bgcolor="bbffbb"
|130||August 27|| Braves||3 – 2 10||Williams (4–2)||Eichhorn (4–5)|||| 35,107 ||73–57||
|- align="center" bgcolor="bbffbb"
|131||August 28|| Astros||6–1 ||Maddux (15–10)||Cano (0–1)|||| 23,039 ||74–57||
|- align="center" bgcolor="bbffbb"
|132||August 29|| Astros||10 – 9 10||Assenmacher (2–3)||Smith (3–4)|||| 25,829 ||75–57||Cubs come back from 9–0 deficit
|- align="center" bgcolor="ffbbbb"
|133||August 30|| Astros||8–4 ||Scott (18–7)||Sutcliffe (13–11)|||| 37,218 ||75–58||
|-

|- align="center" bgcolor="ffbbbb"
|134||September 1||@ Braves||5–1 ||Lilliquist (8–8)||Wilson (5–3)||Stanton (2)|| 14,255 ||75–59||
|- align="center" bgcolor="bbffbb"
|135||September 2||@ Braves||10–3 ||Maddux (16–10)||Clary (4–3)|||| 41,020 ||76–59||
|- align="center" bgcolor="ffbbbb"
|136||September 3||@ Braves||8–5 ||P. Smith (5–13)||Bielecki (14–6)||Stanton (3)|| 25,189 ||76–60||
|- align="center" bgcolor="bbffbb"
|137||September 4||@ Mets||7–3 ||Sutcliffe (14–11)||Cone (12–7)||Lancaster (6)|| 46,049 ||77–60||
|- align="center" bgcolor="ffbbbb"
|138||September 5||@ Mets||3–2 ||Fernandez (11–3)||Williams (4–3)|||| 39,352 ||77–61||
|- align="center" bgcolor="ffbbbb"
|139||September 6||@ Phillies||9–1 ||Ruffin (5–8)||Maddux (16–11)|||| 17,272 ||77–62||
|- align="center" bgcolor="bbffbb"
|140||September 7||@ Phillies||6–2 ||Bielecki (15–6)||Howell (11–11)|||| 13,058 ||78–62||
|- align="center" bgcolor="ffbbbb"
|141||September 8|| Cardinals||11–8 ||Carpenter (3–4)||Williams (4–4)||Quisenberry (6)|| 35,231 ||78–63||
|- align="center" bgcolor="bbffbb"
|142||September 9|| Cardinals||3 – 2 10||Assenmacher (3–3)||Dayley (3–2)|||| 37,633 ||79–63||
|- align="center" bgcolor="bbffbb"
|143||September 10|| Cardinals||4–1 ||Sanderson (10–8)||Hill (7–12)||Williams (32)|| 37,281 ||80–63||
|- align="center" bgcolor="bbffbb"
|144||September 11|| Expos||4–3 ||Maddux (17–11)||Langston (11–7)||Williams (33)|| 29,190 ||81–63||
|- align="center" bgcolor="bbffbb"
|145||September 12|| Expos||2–0 ||Bielecki (16–6)||B. Smith (10–9)|||| 36,333 ||82–63||
|- align="center" bgcolor="bbffbb"
|146||September 13|| Expos||3–1 ||Sanderson (11–8)||Gross (11–11)||Lancaster (7)|| 34,870 ||83–63||
|- align="center" bgcolor="bbffbb"
|147||September 15||@ Pirates||7–2 ||Sutcliffe (15–11)||Belinda (0–1)|||| 12,607 ||84–63||
|- align="center" bgcolor="ffbbbb"
|148||September 16||@ Pirates||8–6 ||Smiley (12–7)||Maddux (17–12)|||| 15,668 ||84–64||
|- align="center" bgcolor="ffbbbb"
|149||September 17||@ Pirates||2–0 ||Drabek (13–11)||Bielecki (16–7)|||| 21,081 ||84–65||
|- align="center" bgcolor="bbffbb"
|150||September 18|| Mets||10–6 ||Wilkins (1–0)||Viola (3–5)||Williams (34)|| 38,138 ||85–65||
|- align="center" bgcolor="ffbbbb"
|151||September 19|| Mets||5–2 ||Ojeda (13–10)||Wilson (5–4)||Gooden (1)|| 35,937 ||85–66||
|- align="center" bgcolor="ffbbbb"
|152||September 20|| Phillies||9–8 ||Carman (5–15)||Lancaster (3–2)||McDowell (19)|| 21,620 ||85–67||
|- align="center" bgcolor="bbffbb"
|153||September 21|| Phillies||9–1 ||Maddux (18–12)||Mulholland (4–7)|||| 22,885 ||86–67||
|- align="center" bgcolor="bbffbb"
|154||September 22|| Pirates||4–2 ||Bielecki (17–7)||Drabek (13–12)||Williams (35)|| 34,040 ||87–67||
|- align="center" bgcolor="bbffbb"
|155||September 23|| Pirates||3–2 ||Lancaster (4–2)||Bair (2–3)|||| 36,849 ||88–67||
|- align="center" bgcolor="bbffbb"
|156||September 24|| Pirates||4–2 ||Wilson (6–4)||Robinson (7–12)||Pico (1)|| 37,904 ||89–67||
|- align="center" bgcolor="ffbbbb"
|157||September 25||@ Expos||4 – 3 10||Burke (9–3)||Sanderson (11–9)|||| 10,305 ||89–68||
|- align="center" bgcolor="bbffbb"
|158||September 26||@ Expos||3–2 ||Maddux (19–12)||Den. Martinez (16–7)||Williams (36)|| 11,615 ||90–68||Cubs clinch NL East title
|- align="center" bgcolor="bbffbb"
|159||September 27||@ Expos||7–2 ||Bielecki (18–7)||Thompson (0–2)||Pico (2)|| 12,442 ||91–68||
|- align="center" bgcolor="ffbbbb"
|160||September 29||@ Cardinals||7–5 ||Dayley (4–3)||Assenmacher (3–4)||Terry (2)|| 41,599 ||91–69||
|- align="center" bgcolor="bbffbb"
|161||September 30||@ Cardinals||6–4 ||Pico (3–1)||Costello (5–4)||Lancaster (8)|| 43,570 ||92–69||
|-

|- align="center" bgcolor="bbffbb"
|- align="center" bgcolor="bbffbb"
|162||October 1||@ Cardinals||5–1 ||Sutcliffe (16–11)||Hill (7–15)|||| 37,846 ||93–69||
|-

Player stats

Batting

Starters by position
Note: Pos = Position; G = Games played; AB = At bats; H = Hits; Avg. = Batting average; HR = Home runs; RBI = Runs batted in

Other batters
Note: G = Games played; AB = At bats; H = Hits; Avg. = Batting average; HR = Home runs; RBI = Runs batted in

Pitching

Starting pitchers 
Note: G = Games pitched; IP = Innings pitched; W = Wins; L = Losses; ERA = Earned run average; SO = Strikeouts

Other pitchers 
Note: G = Games pitched; IP = Innings pitched; W = Wins; L = Losses; ERA = Earned run average; SO = Strikeouts

Relief pitchers 
Note: G = Games pitched; W = Wins; L = Losses; SV = Saves; ERA = Earned run average; SO = Strikeouts

NLCS

Game 1
October 4 at Wrigley Field in Chicago

Game 2
October 5 at Wrigley Field in Chicago

Game 3
October 7 at Candlestick Park in San Francisco

Game 4
October 8 at Candlestick Park in San Francisco

Game 5
October 9 at Candlestick Park in San Francisco

The Giants made it to their first World Series since 1962 with a 3–2 win over the Cubs to win the 1989 National League pennant, four games to one. The final game pitted Mike Bielecki against a well-rested (due to his quick exit from Game 2) Rick Reuschel. Reuschel made amends for his poor start in Game 2 by giving up only one run over eight innings. The one run Reuschel gave up was an unearned run the Cubs scored when Walton reached on an error by Mitchell and then scored on Sandberg's double. The Cubs held the 1–0 lead until the seventh inning when Will Clark tripled and scored on Mitchell's sacrifice fly.

The Cubs did rally, however, in the ninth with three straight singles that made it 3–2. But Sandberg grounded out sending the Giants to their first World Series since 1962.

Awards and honors
 Ryne Sandberg, National League Leader, Runs (104)

All-Star Game
 Ryne Sandberg, second base, starter
 Andre Dawson, outfield, reserve
 Rick Sutcliffe, pitcher, reserve
 Mitch Williams, relief pitcher, reserve

Farm system

References

External links
1989 Chicago Cubs at Baseball Reference
1989 Cubs on a Chicago-centric wiki

Chicago Cubs seasons
Chicago Cubs season
National League East champion seasons
Chicago
1980s in Chicago
1989 in Illinois